Klaus Ackermann (born 20 March 1946 in Hamm) is a retired German footballer. He spent ten seasons in the Bundesliga with Borussia Mönchengladbach, 1. FC Kaiserslautern and Borussia Dortmund.

Honours
 DFB-Pokal finalist: 1971–72

References

External links
 

1946 births
Living people
Sportspeople from Hamm
German footballers
SC Preußen Münster players
Borussia Mönchengladbach players
1. FC Kaiserslautern players
Borussia Dortmund players
Bundesliga players
2. Bundesliga players
Association football midfielders
Footballers from North Rhine-Westphalia
20th-century German people